Nina Morgana (November 15, 1891 – July 8, 1986) was an American soprano, a protégée of Enrico Caruso, who sang with the Metropolitan Opera for fifteen seasons, from 1920 to 1935. She was of Italian descent.

Early life
Nina Morgana was born and raised in Buffalo, New York, the daughter of Sicilian immigrants Calogero (Charles) and Concetta Morgana. She was a child performer in the "Venice in America" exhibit at the Pan-American Exposition in 1901. In 1906, she sang at a concert in Buffalo to benefit the survivors of the San Francisco earthquake that year. After an audition with Enrico Caruso when he was in Buffalo to perform a concert, Caruso sent a letter on her behalf to the retired soprano Teresa Arkel, who accepted the young Morgana as a student at her estate in Milan. Morgana studied voice with Arkel from 1909 to 1913.

The soprano's siblings included Dante J. Morgana, M.D., a prominent eye surgeon based in Buffalo, Charles Morgana, a Ford Motor Company executive selected personally by Henry Ford, and David Morgana, who became a Trappist monk.

Career
During her vocal training in Italy, Teresa Arkel recommended her to conductor Tullio Serafin for the small role of the Forest Bird in a production of Siegfried at the Teatro Dal Verme. She appeared in the premiere of Der Rosenkavalier at La Scala in 1911. In 1917–1918, Morgana was a frequent assisting artist (the classical-music equivalent of a secondary role on the stage or in films) with Enrico Caruso during his North American concert tours. She was with the Chicago Opera in the 1919–1920 season. She sang with the Metropolitan Opera from 1920 to 1935, making her debut as Gilda in Rigoletto. Her other best-known roles were Amina in La Sonnambula, Nedda in Pagliacci, Musetta in La bohème, and Micaela in Carmen. She also gave concerts, including live radio concerts.

In 1926 Morgana sued Chadwick Pictures for a silent film called The Midnight Girl (1925), in which a singer character named "Nina Morgana" is portrayed by actress Dolores Cassinelli as "debauched" and "passé".

Personal life
In 1921, Nina Morgana married Bruno Zirato, Caruso's secretary and later general manager of the New York Philharmonic, where he also served as personal representative of conductor Arturo Toscanini.  Caruso, who was in Italy recuperating from a serious illness when Morgana and Zirato were married, served as best man in absentia at their wedding. Caruso suffered a sudden relapse and died in his native Naples on August 2, 1921, only weeks after the wedding. Bruno Zirato died in November, 1972; Nina Morgana died in Ithaca, New York in 1986, aged 94 years, survived by her son, Bruno Zirato Jr. (1922-2008), a television producer with Goodson-Todman Associates.

References

External links
 Nina Morgana Zirato's gravesite, on Find a Grave.
 Two 1920 recordings of Nina Morgana for the Victor Talking Machine Company; Discography of American Historical Recordings, University of California at Santa Barbara Libraries. 
 A 1915 photograph of Nina Morgana, in the Bain News Service photograph collection, Library of Congress.
 A 1926 portrait of Nina Morgana by Nickolas Muray, from Condé Nast.

1891 births
1986 deaths
American opera singers
20th-century American singers